Indian Creek is a stream in Linn County, Iowa, in the United States. It is a tributary of the Cedar River.

See also
List of rivers of Iowa

References

Rivers of Iowa